Toshikazu is a masculine Japanese given name.

Possible writings
Toshikazu can be written using different combinations of kanji characters. Some examples:

敏一, "agile, one"
敏和, "agile, harmony"
敏多, "agile, many"
敏数, "agile, number"
俊一, "talented, one"
俊和, "talented, harmony"
俊多, "talented, many"
俊数, "talented, number"
利一, "benefit, one"
利和, "benefit, harmony"
利多, "benefit, many"
利数, "benefit, number"
年一, "year, one"
年和, "year, harmony"
寿一, "long life, one"
寿和, "long life, harmony"

The name can also be written in hiragana としかず or katakana トシカズ.

Notable people with the name
Toshikazu Ichimura (市村 俊和, born 1941), Japanese aikidoka.
Toshikazu Irie (入江 利和, born 1984), Japanese footballer.
Toshikazu Kase (加瀬 俊一, 1903–2004), Japanese civil servant and diplomat.
Toshikazu Katayama (片山 敏一, born 1913), Japanese figure skater.
Toshikazu Kato (加藤 寿一, born 1981), Japanese footballer.
Toshikazu Kawasaki (川崎 敏和, born 1955), Japanese origami artist.
Toshikazu Nakamichi (中道 紀和, born 1971), Japanese rugby union player.
Toshikazu Omae (大前敏一, 1902–1978), Japanese naval officer and author.
Toshikazu Nishimura (西村 寿一, born 1963), Japanese voice actor.
Toshikazu Sano (佐野 敏一, born 1940), Japanese football referee.
Toshikazu Sugihara (杉原 敏一, born 1964), Japanese golfer.
Toshikazu Sunada (砂田 利一, born 1948), Japanese mathematician and writer.
Toshikazu Saito (齋藤 俊一, ????–1582), Japanese samurai.
Toshikazu Wakatsuki (若月 俊一, 1910–2006), Japanese medical doctor.
Toshikazu Yamanishi (山西 利和, born 1996), Japanese racewalker.
Toshikazu Yamashita (山下 敏和, born 1977), Japanese sport shooter.

Japanese masculine given names